Darul Hadis Latifiah, formerly known as Madrasah-e-Darul Qirat Majidiah, is an 11–20 boys, Islamic, private school and sixth form in Bethnal Green, Greater London, England. It was established in 1999 by parents and community leaders under the guidance of Abdul Latif Chowdhury (Fultali Saheb).

History 
Madrasah-e-Darul Qirat Majidiah was established in 1999 by parents and community leaders under the guidance of Abdul Latif Chowdhury Fultali, who named it after his father Shah Abdul Majid Chowdhury. Classes were originally held at a rented property in New Road, London, E1. Through private donations local community leaders raised funds to buy the property. Since 1981, the present building at 1 Cornwall Avenue, London, E2 0HW (previously 46-48 Cannon Street Road, London, E1 0BH) were purchased.

The madrasa delivered Bengali and Qur'anic classes, on average to students; in excess of 200 and aged between 5 and 16. The classes were weekdays from 5 pm to 7 pm, and weekends from 10 am to 1 pm.

In 1998, the institution was renamed Darul Hadis Latifiah, after its founder, and established as a secondary school and college, where students receive a full secondary education in line with the National Curriculum as well as being educated in Islamic Studies, Bengali and Urdu.

See also 
Badedeorail Fultali Kamil Madrasa

References

External links 
 

1978 establishments in England
Bethnal Green
Educational institutions established in 1978
Private boys' schools in London
Private schools in the London Borough of Tower Hamlets
Islamic schools in London